Halocyphina is a genus of fungus in the Niaceae family. It is a monotypic genus, containing the single species Halocyphina villosa, a marine fungus found in the USA.

References

External links

Niaceae
Monotypic Agaricales genera